Gamasellus southcotti is a species of mite in the family Ologamasidae.

References

southcotti
Articles created by Qbugbot
Animals described in 1966